Pritchardia aylmer-robinsonii is a species of palm tree that is endemic to the island of Niihau, Hawaii, United States. Harold St. John discovered this species in 1949, and the specific epithet refers to Aylmer Francis Robinson, a member of the family that owned the island. P. aylmer-robinsonii has been reintroduced to the Makauwahi Cave Reserve on Kauai, where the species is believed to have previously ranged.

References

External links
Lo‘ulu

aylmer-robinsonii
Trees of Hawaii
Endemic flora of Hawaii
Critically endangered plants
Taxonomy articles created by Polbot